1995 Rugby League World Cup Group C was one of the three groups in the 1995 Rugby League World Cup. The group consisted of France, Wales and Western Samoa.

Ladder

Wales vs France

Western Samoa vs France

Wales vs Western Samoa
With a World Cup Semi-final spot on the line, the largest rugby league attendance in Swansea for 20 years saw Wales defeat the "Samoan Demolition Squad" 22–10.

References

External links
1995 World Cup audio highlights
1995 World Cup Final at rlphotos.com
1995 World Cup data at hunterlink.net.au
1995 World Cup at rlif.com
1995 World Cup at rlhalloffame.org.uk
1995 World Cup at rugbyleagueproject.com
1995 World Cup at 188-rugby-league.co.uk